Chud or Chude (in Finnic languages: tšuudi, čuđit) is a term historically applied in the early East Slavic annals to several Finnic peoples in the area of what is now Estonia, Karelia and Northwestern Russia.

Arguably, the earliest attested written use of the word "Chuds" to describe Finnic peoples (presumably early Estonians) was c. 1100, in the earliest East Slavic chronicles. According to the Primary Chronicle, the invading troops of Yaroslav I the Wise defeated "Chuds" in a battle in 1030 and then established the fort of "Yuryev" (in what is now Tartu, Estonia).

According to Old East Slavic chronicles, the Chuds were among the founders of the Rus' state.

Etymology 
There are a number of hypotheses as to the origin of the term. Chud could be derived from the Slavic word tjudjo ('foreign' or 'strange'), which in turn is derived from the Gothic word meaning 'folk' (compare Teutonic). Another hypothesis is that the term was derived from a transformation of the Finno-Ugric name for the wood grouse. Yet another hypothesis contends that it is derived from the Sami word tshudde or čuđđe, meaning an enemy or adversary. This, however, would have required prominent Sami presence in trading centers around Lake Ladoga.

Identity 
Chuds have traditionally been believed to belong to the group of Baltic-Finnic peoples, though there have been some debate as to which specific group. After the first encounter with the Chuds, Slavic people tended to call other Finnic-speaking peoples Chuds, and thus became a collective name for the Finnic neighbours in Russian cultural tradition. Many writers contend that the Chuds were Vepsians, Fasmer posits them in Karelia while Smirnov suggests the Setos are descendants of the Chuds. In recent research on toponymy of the Luga and Volkhov river catchment areas Finnish fennougrist Pauli Rahkonen has come to the conclusion, that the language spoken in the area has been Finnic only in the vicinity of the southern coasts of Lake Ladoga and the Gulf of Finland, but more upstream of the two rivers, the language, as based on the evidence of hydronyms in the area, has represented other Finno-Ugric languages than Finnic. However, the Zavoloshka Chuds in the White Sea catchment area seem to have spoken Finnic languages based on the evidence of substrate toponymy in northern Russia carried out recently by Finnish Finno-Ugrist Janne Saarikivi.

Chuds in chronicles 
The East Slavic Primary Chronicle describes Chuds as co-founders of the Rus' Khaganate state along with Krivichs, Veps, Ilmen Slavs and Vikings. In other ancient East Slavic chronicles, the term "Chuds" refers to several Finnic tribes, early Estonian groups in particular. In 1030, Prince Yaroslav the Wise of Kiev won a military campaign against the Chuds and established a fort in Yuryev (present day Tartu, in southeastern Estonia). Kievan rulers then collected tribute from the Chuds of the surrounding ancient Estonian county of Ugaunia, possibly until 1061, when, according to the chronicles, Yuryev was burned down by Estonian tribe called Sosols (probably Sackalians, Oeselians or Harionenses). Most of the raids against Chuds described in medieval East Slavic chronicles occur in present-day Estonia. The border lake between Estonia and Russia is still called Chudskoye (Chud Lake) in Russian. However, many ancient references to Chuds talk of peoples very far from Estonia, like Zavoloshka Chuds between Mordovians and Komis.

Chuds in folklore
In Russian folk legends, the Chudes were described as exalted and beautiful. One characteristic of the Chudes was 'white-eyed', which means lightly colored eyes.

Russian bylinas reminisce about the destruction of the Chudes when the Slavs were occupying their territories. When a Chude township was attacked, Chude women themselves drowned themselves, along with their jewels and children, in order to avoid robbery or rape.

In the chronicles which narrate about the founding of Russia, the Chudes are mentioned as one of the founder races, with the Slav and the Varyags (Varangians).

Folk etymology derives the word from Old East Slavic language (chuzhoi, 'foreign'; or chudnoi 'odd'; or chud 'weird'), or alternatively from chudnyi, wonderful, miraculous, excellent, attractive.

Chuds or Tchuds are traditional generic villains in some Sami legends, as well as in the Sami-language movie Pathfinder from 1987, which is loosely based on such legends.

Other sources suggest that ancient Chuds spoke a Finnic language similar to the Veps language.

Use of term in historical times 

Later, the word Chuds was more often used for more eastern Finnic peoples, Veps and Votes in particular, while some derivatives of chud like chukhna or chukhonets were applied to more western Finns and Estonians. Following the Russian conquests of Finland 1714–1809, and increasing contacts between Finns and Saint Petersburg, Finns perceived the word Chud to be disparaging and hinting at the serfdom that the Russians were believed to find fit for the Finns. However, as a disparaging word, it was rather chukhna that was applied also to Finns and Estonians as late as during the Winter War, 1939–1940, between the Soviet Union and Finland.

In present-day Russian vernacular, the word chukhna is often used to denote the Veps. The name Chuds (or Northern Chuds) has been used for Veps people also by some anthropologists.

In the mytho-poetical tradition of the Komi, the word chud can also designate Komi heroes and heathens; Old Believers; another people different from the Komi; or robbers—the latter two are the typical legends in Sámi folklore. In fact, the legends about Chuds (Čuđit) cover a large area in northern Europe from Scandinavia to the Urals, bounded by Lake Ladoga in the south, the northern and eastern districts of the Vologda province, and passing by the Kirov region, further into Komi-Permyak Okrug. It has from this area spread to Trans-Ural region through mediation of migrants from European North.

See also 
 Chudovo

References

External links 
 
 

History of ethnic groups in Russia
Social history of Estonia
Medieval ethnic groups of Europe
Finnic peoples
Baltic Finns